is a district located in Saitama Prefecture, Japan.

In the 2005 census reports, the district has an estimated population of 89,552. The total area is 89.77 km2.

The district consists of three towns:
Miyoshi
Moroyama
Ogose

District timeline
April 9, 1972: The town of Fukuoka gains city status and is renamed Kamifukuoka.
April 10, 1972: The town of Fujimi gains city status.
September 1, 1976: The town of Sakado gains city status.
September 1, 1991: The town of Tsurugashima gains city status.
October 1, 1991: The town of Hidaka gains city status.
January 1, 2005: The village of Naguri merges with the city of Hannō.
October 1, 2005: The town of Ōi merges with the city of Kamifukuoka to create the new city of Fujimino.

Districts in Saitama Prefecture